Sarah Nurse (born January 4, 1995) is a Canadian professional ice hockey player of the Canadian women's national ice hockey team. She made her debut with the national team at the 2015 4 Nations Cup. In 2018, she represented Canada at the 2018 Winter Olympics where she won a silver medal. Her success continued as she scored the opening goal in the 2022 Gold medal game where Team Canada defeated the United States 3-2.

Nurse was drafted second overall by the Toronto Furies in the 2018 CWHL Draft.

Playing career

PWHL
Nurse won a silver medal with Stoney Creek at the Ontario Women's Hockey Association (OWHA) provincials. She also won a bronze medal in high school at the 2010 OFSSAA championships and a silver at OFSSAA 2011. In 2010, she played with Team Heaney and reached the quarter-finals of the 2010 Ontario Winter Games.

During the 2010–11 Provincial Women's Hockey League (PWHL) season, she led the Stoney Creek Jr. Sabres in scoring. She was named to the OWHA All-Star Team for a game vs. Team Ontario Under-18. For the 2011–12 PWHL season, she was named an alternate captain with Stoney Creek. She helped the club win a bronze medal at the PWHL championships. She ranked second on the club in Stoney Creek scoring.

With the Stoney Creek Jr. Sabres of the PWHL, she broke the league record shared by Kelly Sabatine and Thea Imbrogno for most goals in a season. Breaking the mark in the 2012–13 season, Nurse scored 35 goals, highlighted by a hat-trick in the season's final game.

Wisconsin Badgers
Nurse played NCAA Division hockey with the Wisconsin Badgers women's ice hockey program of the Western Collegiate Hockey Association (WCHA).

In the 2015 WCHA Final Faceoff championship game, Nurse scored twice, including the game-winning goal against Bemidji State.

An 8–2 win on December 4, 2016, against the Badgers’ archrivals, the Minnesota Golden Gophers provided Nurse with a career milestone. Playing in front of a sellout crowd at LaBahn Arena, Nurse scored three goals, becoming the first player in program history to score a hat-trick against Minnesota.

CWHL
After competing at the 2018 Winter Olympics, Nurse was drafted second overall by the Toronto Furies in the 2018 CWHL Draft. On October 17, 2018, a Furies match at MasterCard Centre versus the visiting Shenzhen KRS Vanke Rays saw Nurse score the first goal of her CWHL career. Breaking a 1–1 tie on the power play at the 8:54 mark of the third, said goal would also stand as the game-winning tally in a 3–1 final, which provided Shea Tiley with her first goaltending win in league play.

PWHPA
Skating for Team Sonnet (Toronto), Nurse participated in the 2021 Secret Cup, which was the Canadian leg of the 2020–21 PWHPA Dream Gap Tour. She logged a goal and an assist in a 4-2 championship game loss versus Team Bauer (Montreal).

International play
Nurse was a member of Team Ontario blue that competed at the 2011 and 2012 National Women's Under-18 Championship, winning gold in 2011 and a bronze in 2012. She was a member of the Canadian team that captured gold at the 2013 IIHF World Women's U18 Championship.

At the 2015 4 Nations Cup, Nurse was a member of Canada's U22/Development Team, winning a gold medal. She contributed two assists in a 4–1 win over Finland on January 3, 2015.

Nurse participated for Team Canada in the Elite Women's 3-on-3 game at the Skills Competition of the 2020 National Hockey League All-Star Game.

Nurse was selected to compete for Team Canada in the 2018 Winter Olympics in PyeongChang, South Korea. She scored her first Olympic goal in a 2–1 victory over the United States on February 14. She helped Team Canada take home a silver medal in a shootout against the United States.

On January 11, 2022, Nurse was named to Canada's 2022 Olympic team. In Beijing, she set two new Olympic records for most points (18) and most assists (13) in a single women's tournament.

Career statistics

Regular season and playoffs

International

Awards and honours

NCAA
All-WCHA Rookie Team (2013-14)
2015 WCHA Frozen Face-Off Most Outstanding Player
WCHA All-Tournament Team (2015)
All-WCHA Third Team (2015-16)
Second-Team All-American (2016-17)
WCHA 20th Anniversary Team

IIHF and Olympics 
 IIHF Women's World Hockey Championship gold medalist (2021–2022) and bronze medalist (2019)
 Olympic gold medalist (2022) and silver medalist (2018)

Personal life
Nurse began skating when she was three years old. She started playing hockey when she was five. Her cousins are professional hockey player Darnell Nurse of the Edmonton Oilers and basketball player Kia Nurse of the Phoenix Mercury. Her uncles were also involved in athletics; her uncle Donovan McNabb played pro football in the National Football League (NFL) as a quarterback and her other uncle, Richard Nurse, was a wide receiver for the Hamilton Tiger-Cats of the Canadian Football League (CFL).

Nurse, the biracial daughter of a black Trinidadian father and a white mother, has spoken at length about racism in ice hockey. When a student wore a costume depicting Barack Obama being lynched to a Badgers football game in 2016, Nurse posted a statement condemning not just the student, but a culture of racism in student athletics at the University of Wisconsin. In the wake of the George Floyd protests in the summer of 2020, Nurse spoke with Caroline Cameron of Sportsnet, urging Canadians not to separate themselves from the racism of the United States, citing the discrimination against Viola Desmond. Nurse told The Canadian Press in November that her social media commentary on racial equality left her "flooded with interview requests". In September 2020, Liz Knox resigned her position on the PWHPA board to allow Nurse to take her place, citing the association's "blind spot" with regards to race issues in ice hockey.

In November 2020, Mattel and Tim Hortons collaborated on two limited-edition Barbie dolls based on Nurse and fellow hockey player Marie-Philip Poulin. The dolls were created as part of Barbie's You Can Be Anything program, which aims to inspire "girls to reach their limitless potential through imaginative play and engaging with meaningful role models." Nurse was featured on the June 2021 cover of Elle Canada along with Hanna Bunton and Brigette Lacquette. Nurse appeared as a guest judge in an episode of the third season of Canada's Drag Race, which aired in summer 2022. Also in 2022, Nurse became the first woman to appear on the cover of an EA Sports NHL title with NHL 23, appearing alongside Trevor Zegras.

References

External links
Canadian Olympic profile

1995 births
Living people
Black Canadian ice hockey players
Canadian expatriate ice hockey players in the United States
Canadian women's ice hockey forwards
Canadian sportspeople of Trinidad and Tobago descent
Ice hockey people from Ontario
Ice hockey players at the 2018 Winter Olympics
Ice hockey players at the 2022 Winter Olympics
Medalists at the 2018 Winter Olympics
Medalists at the 2022 Winter Olympics
Olympic ice hockey players of Canada
Olympic medalists in ice hockey
Olympic gold medalists for Canada
Olympic silver medalists for Canada
Sportspeople from Hamilton, Ontario
Toronto Furies players
Wisconsin Badgers women's ice hockey players
Nurse family
Professional Women's Hockey Players Association players